Liturgics, also called liturgical studies or liturgiology, is the academic discipline dedicated to the study of liturgy (public worship rites, rituals, and practices). Liturgics scholars typically specialize in a single approach drawn from another scholarly field.  The most common sub-disciplines are: history or church history, theology, and anthropology. Although liturgics scholars using these approaches apply the principles of their respective disciplines to their research, all liturgics scholars focus their work in the ritual behaviors of the members of faith communities.

See also
Ritology

External links 
North American Academy of Liturgy (official website)

Academic disciplines
Liturgists
Practical theology

bg:Литургия
el:Λειτουργική